Lionel Vivian "Nappy" Ollington (19 December 1927 – 23 May 2014) was an Australian rules footballer who played with Footscray in the Victorian Football League (VFL). 

He was later known as an organizer and promoter of the traditional Australian gambling game Two-up. He was operating outside the law for two decades but eventually permitted to hold legal games annually on Anzac Day. The traditional Anzac Day two up games at Flemington Racetrack are being continued by Lionel Ollington's son.

Notes

External links 
		

2014 deaths
1927 births
Australian rules footballers from Victoria (Australia)
Western Bulldogs players